Citric acid/potassium-sodium citrate is a drug used in the treatment of metabolic acidosis (a disorder in which the blood is too acidic).

External links 
 Citric acid/potassium-sodium citrate entry in the public domain NCI Dictionary of Cancer Terms

Acid–base disturbances
Citric acid cycle compounds
Potassium compounds
Combination drugs